Huma Qureshi is a freelance journalist who writes features on culture, literature film, food, design, homes, property, travel & lifestyle.

Qureshi is a former member of the Consumer team for the Guardian and Observer.

Background
Huma got her first break at The Observer, where she was offered a job as a reporter after having worked as an intern for three months. She also wrote features for The Guardian for five years before leaving to go freelance in 2010.
 
She now writes for various titles, including The Guardian, The Independent, The i, The Times, and Woman & Home. Huma also appears on BBC Asian Network, appearing as "Money Girl".

Personal life
Huma married Richard and they have three sons.

Awards
Huma has won following awards;
2008  –  Women of the Future Media Awards (Commended)
2008  –  Finalist in the Prince of Wales Mosaic Talent awards (Arts, Culture and Media category)
2007  –  BritStar: Outstanding Young British Pakistani by the High Commission of Pakistan
2007  –  Most Promising Newcomer at the BIBA press awards.

References

External links
 

Living people
British journalists
Year of birth missing (living people)